Vladislav "Vlado" Kristl (24 January 1923, Zagreb, Croatia – 7 July 2004, Munich, Germany) was a filmmaker and artist, best known for his animations and short films.

Biography 
Vladislav "Vlado" Kristl was born 24 January 1923 in Zagreb, Croatia. Kristl first came to international prominence for his formally challenging and rigorous animations, particularly Don Kihot (freely inspired by Cervantes' Don Quixote). The film is a "graphical and abstract masterpiece which went beyond all existing conventions" and was awarded the main prize at the Oberhausen International Short Film Festival. Kristl regarded this film, which was not his first, as the one where he "was finally given a free rein".

In 1962 Kristl made General i resni clovek (The General and the real man), a satirical live action short film which got him into trouble with the board of censors.

He died in 2004, aged 81, in Munich, Germany. With his partner Jelena he had two children, Madeleine (b. 1966) and Pepe Stephan (b. 1968).

He published two books of poetry: Neznatna lirika (Insignificant lyrics, 1959), and Pet bijelih stepenica (Five white steps, 1961) in Croatian, and several books in German.

Filmography
Sagrenska Koza (The Piece of Shagreen Leather) – 1960
Don Kihot – 1961
General I Resni Clovek/Der General und der Ernste Mensch (The General and the Real Human Being) – 1962 – 12 minutes
Arme Leute – 1963 – 8 minutes
Madeleine, Madeleine – 1963 – 11 minutes
Der Damm (The Dam) – 1964 – 80 minutes
Autorennen – 1965 – 10 minutes
 (The Letter) – 1966 – 83 minutes
Prometheus – 1966 – 10 minutes
Die Utopen – 1967 – 9 minutes
Sekundenfilme – 1968 – 19 minutes
100 Blatt Schreibblock – 1968 – 26 minutes
Italienisches Capricco – 1969 – 30 minutes
Film oder Macht (Film or Power) – 1970 – 110 minutes
Obrigkeitsfilm (The Film Of The Authority) – 1971 – 86 minutes
Literaturverfilmung – 1973 – 10 minutes
Horizonte – 1973 – 8 minutes
Kollektivfilm – 1974 – 18 minutes
Diese Gebichte: Tod Der Hierachie – 1975 – 58 minutes
Verräter Der Jungen Deutschen Films Schlafen Nicht – 1982 – 6minutes
Tod der Zuschauer (Death To The Spectator) – 1983 – 110 minutes
Die Schule Der Postmoderne – 1990 – 15 minutes
Die Hälfte Des Reichtums Für Die Hälfte Der Schönheit – 1994 – 9 minutes
Als Man Noch Aus Persönlichen Gründen Gelebt Hat – 1996 – 6 minutes
Der Letzte Klon – 1998 – 6 minutes
Drei Faule Schweine – 2000 – 7 minutes
Kunst Ist Nur Ausserhalb Der Menschengesellschaft – 2002 – 9 minutes
Weltkongress Der Obdachlosen – 2004 – 5 minutes

Films about Kristl include:
Vlado Kristl Portrait (directed by Kurt Benning; 2003) – 60 minutes
Vlado Kristl – Ich bin ein Mensch-Versuch (Vlado Kristl – I am a Human Experiment; directed by Johanna Pauline Maier and Markus Nechleba; 2006) – 87 minutes

Publications in German
Geschäfte, die es nicht gibt, Ed. Längsfeld, München 1966
Komödien, Kinema Verlag, Berlin 1968
Mundmaschine, UnVERLAG, München 1969
Vorworte (Zeitschrift für unbrauchbare Texte) 8 Nummern c/o Barbara Schlottke, München 1970/71
Sekundenfilme, Edition Suhrkamp Verlag (Wegen schlechtem Verkaufs barbarisch eingestampft vom selb. Verlag), Frankfurt/Main 1971
Kultur der Anarchie, Kommunales Kino, Frankfurt, 1975
Unerlaubte Schönheit, Filmkritikheft Nr 233, Mai 1976
Video-theater, Freunder der Deutschen Kinemathek e.V., Berlin, 1977
Körper des Unrechts, S.A.U.-Verlag, München 1979
Hamburg 1980, Verlag Michael Kellner, Hamburg 1980
Revolution 1941–1980, I. Band 1. und 2. Auflage, Hamburg 1980
Fremdenheft oder vom Glück unter Eingebildeten zu Sein, Hamburg 1981 (SV)
Techniken der Kunst machen, Kiel 1981 (SV)
Titel und Würden, Verlag Michael Kellner, Hamburg 1983
Zeichnung, 1.-DM Verlag, Hamburg, 1984
Revolution II. Band, mit Angehängtem I. Band, 1.-DM Verlag, Hamburg, 1984
Als man noch aus Persönlichen Grunden gelebt hat, 1.-DM Verlag, Hamburg, 1986
Die Postmoderne, 1.-DM Verlag, Hamburg, 1987
Die Intelligenz, Haus Höchster Schlossplatz 1 e.V., Höchst, 1990
Die Sonne,  Haus Höchster Schlossplatz 1 e.V., Höchst, 1990

References

External links

Obituary 

1923 births
2004 deaths
Artists from Zagreb
Croatian animators
Croatian animated film directors
Yugoslav animators
Croatian expatriates in Germany
20th-century Croatian painters
Croatian male painters
Croatian experimental filmmakers
German experimental filmmakers
20th-century Croatian male artists